Underneath the Laughter is a 1993 Leæther Strip album released by Zoth Ommog Records (CD ZOT 103).

Track listing
"Turn to Stone"
"Another World"
"We Will Follow"
"Don't Tame Your Soul"
"Atheistic Sermon"
"Prying Eyes"
"World's End"
"Another Leader"
"The White Disgrace"

References

1993 albums
Leæther Strip albums
Zoth Ommog Records albums